Glen Vine is a village on the Isle of Man in the parish of Marown. It is on the Isle of Man TT course four miles by road from Douglas.

The Church of England parish church for Marown is St Runius church in Glen Vine. In 1844, Phillip Killey, who was later to be a Captain of the Parish in Marown, donated land adjoining his estate on the main road between Glen Vine and Crosby for the building of a new church and the foundation stone was laid in 1849. The church, which was designed by the architect Ewan Christian, was consecrated in 1859. A new vestry was added in 1899 and a new roof in 1958, with the south transept eventually converted into a meeting room.

The parish primary school, Marown Primary School, was built in the 1980s, and is located in Glen Vine. The school was expanded in 2001.

References

Villages in the Isle of Man
Roads in the Isle of Man
Geography of the Isle of Man